Shahamad Khan   (1 July 1879 – 28 July 1947) was an Indian recipient of the Victoria Cross, the highest and most prestigious award for gallantry in the face of the enemy that can be awarded to British and Commonwealth forces.

Military career
A Punjabi Muslim Rajput from District Rawalpindi in modern Pakistan, he was 36 years old, and a Naik in the 89th Punjabis, British Indian Army (now 1st Battalion the Baloch Regiment, Pakistan Army) during the First World War. He served on the Tigris Front in Mesopotamia, when the following deed took place, for which he was awarded the VC:

He later achieved the rank of Subedar. He is buried in his ancestral village of Takhti, Pakistan.

See also
Geoghegan, Col NM, and Campbell, Capt MHA. (1928). History of the 1st Battalion 8th Punjab Regiment. Aldershot: Gale & Polden.
Ahmad, Maj Rifat Nadeem, and Ahmed, Maj Gen Rafiuddin. (2006). Unfaded Glory: The 8th Punjab Regiment 1798-1956. Abbottabad: The Baloch Regimental Centre.
Monuments to Courage (David Harvey, 1999).
The Register of the Victoria Cross (This England, 1997).

References

External links
Shah Ahmad Khan

1879 births
1947 deaths
British Indian Army soldiers
People from Rawalpindi District
Punjabi people
Indian World War I recipients of the Victoria Cross
Indian Army personnel of World War I